Janów  is a village in the administrative district of Gmina Elbląg, within Elbląg County, Warmian-Masurian Voivodeship, in northern Poland.

Before 1772 the area was part of Kingdom of Poland, 1772-1945 Prussia and Germany (East Prussia).

According to modern archaeological research, the village is the site of the medieval Old Prussian town and trading emporium Truso.

The village has a population of 360.

References

Villages in Elbląg County